Tees Maar Khan also known by the initialism TMK, is a 2022 Indian Telugu-language action drama film written and directed by Kalyanji Gogana and produced by Nagam Tirupathi Reddy. The film stars Aadi Saikumar, Payal Rajput, Sunil, and Srikanth Iyengar in pivotal roles. The film's music is composed by Sai Karthik.

The film was released theatrically on 19 August 2022 to mixed reviews. The plot follows Tees Maar Khan, who was appointed to fix law and order situation in the city.

Plot 

A young boy and a girl from two broken families, escaping domestic violence and inhuman treatment, meet on a fateful night and instantly form a bond promising to help each other. She, being the eldest, provides him with food, and he vows to protect her. He calls her Amma. The boy christens himself Tees Maar Khan (Aadi Saikumar) after beating up thirty bad men who pass lewd comments at his Amma. For him, she comes first, and their love has no bounds. A lonely police constable adopts these two homeless kids, and they become one family. Amma aka Vasu (Poorna) gets married to Chakri (Sunil). Tees Maar Khan grows into a strong youngster, runs a gym and even does minor settlements in his area. En route to one such settlement, he notices Anaga (Payal Rajput) mimicking his dance moves, falls in love with her, and even joins her college to impress her. Parallelly, Gija (Thakur Anoop Singh), a gangster, controls the entire city and spares no one meddling in his business. But Ranga Rajan (Srikanth Iyengar), the home minister, has other plans and wants to eliminate him at any cost. He hired Tees Maar Khan after Gija allegedly killed his Amma. Tees Maar Khan transformed into a rough Police Officer and start collecting evidence against Gija by thrashing his goons. He kills Qasim (Gija's right hand an) in the process. After Gija kidnaps Anaga he follows them and confronts Gija at his lair. After a fight Gija denies killing TMK's Amma before succumbing to his injuries. Tees Maar Khan returns to his house and check his neighbor's CCTV footage to see what really happened. It was then revealed that Chakri killed his Amma because he doubt their relationship and got 10 million rupees from an unknown person. Tees Maar Khan confronts Chakri and kills him but later is abducted by Talvar (Kabir Singh Duhan) who happens to be the elder brother of Gija. As a final twist it is revealed that Home Minister Ranga Rajan is behind all of this. Tees Maar Khan fakes his death to reach Ranga Rajan & Talvar, and completes his revenge by killing both of them.

Cast 
 Aadi Saikumar as TMK aka Tees Maar Khan
 Payal Rajput as Anaga
 Sunil as Chakri
 Poorna as Vasudha; wife of Chakri
 Srikanth Iyengar as Home Minister Ranga Rajan
 Thakur Anoop Singh as Jija 
 Kabir Duhan Singh as Talwar
 RJ Hemanth as TMK's Friend 
 Ambati Arjun as Arjun (College Student)
 Aziz Naser

Production 
After shooting a song in Goa, filming was completed in December 2021.

Soundtrack 
The film score and soundtrack album of the film is composed by Sai Kartheek. The music rights were acquired by Aditya Music.

Release and reception 
Tees Maar Khan was released on 19 August 2022.

The Times of India gave a rating of 2.5 out of 5 and wrote that "the film impresses with its stellar performances by the cast, good production values, decent cinematography and music, but what doesn't work in its favour are its mediocre screenplay and routine script. However, irrespective of its drawbacks". 123Telugu also rated the film 2.5 out of 5, praised Aadi Saikumar's performance while criticized the story, execution of the screenplay and unnecessary songs. Praising the performances of Aadi and Sunil, Mural Krishna Ch of Cinema Express wrote: "Tees Maar Khan largely entertains with twists on familiar tropes and impressive performances. The film may serve well for the audience who like watching high-voltage masala entertainers".

References

External links

2022 action comedy films
2022 films
Fictional portrayals of the Telangana Police
Law enforcement in fiction
Indian action comedy films
Indian police films
2020s masala films
Films shot in Hyderabad, India
Films set in Hyderabad, India
2020s Telugu-language films
Indian action drama films
2022 action drama films
Films shot in Goa